Syed Atiqul Haq is a Bangladeshi physician & academic. He is
the current president of Asia Pacific League of Associations for Rheumatology for 2018–2020 tenure. He is the founding chairman of department of Rheumatology in Bangabandhu Sheikh Mujib Medical University, Dhaka.

Life and education
Dr Haq was born in Chittagong, Bangladesh. He passed MBBS from Chittagong Medical College. He then completed the FCPS (Medicine) degree from Bangladesh College of Physicians and Surgeons. He was awarded Fellowship of the Royal College of Physicians of Edinburgh in 2003 and International Fellowship of the American College of Rheumatology in 2005.

Achievements
Dr. Haq was the Head of the department of medicine from 2009–2012 in Bangabandhu Sheikh Mujib Medical University, Dhaka. He has edited several international journals on rheumatology. The veteran physician is a former president of the Association of Physician Bangladesh. He was accorded with Gold Medal from Bangladesh Academy of Science for his contribution in medical science in 1997.

References

 Year of birth missing (living people)
 Living people
Bangladeshi rheumatologists
 Bangabandhu Sheikh Mujib Medical University alumni
 People from Chittagong District